Sabra is a genus of moths belonging to the subfamily Drepaninae.

Species
 Sabra harpagula (Esper, [1786])
 Sabra sinica (Yang, 1978)
 Sabra taibaishanensis (Chou & Xiang, 1987)

References

Drepaninae
Drepanidae genera